A T.I.M.E. (A Torah Infertility Medium of Exchange), a New York-based non-profit support group for Orthodox Jewish infertile couples. A TIME also works to educate doctors in halachic matters and rabbis in the latest fertility treatments.

History
A TIME was established in Brooklyn, New York in 1993 by Rabbi Shaul and Brany Rosen, a Bobov Chassidic couple as a social support network for Jewish couples experiencing infertility.

Currently, the organization has over 7,700 registered members and branch offices operate in the United States, Canada, England and Israel.

Services
The organization offers services including: social support forums for couples, coordinating resources for financial aid for treatments, educational programs, physician referrals, adoption services, and a pregnancy loss support program. The organization also publishes a quarterly magazine that includes up-to-date information on the latest fertility technologies.

See also
 Bonei Olam
 Religious response to ART
 Puah Institute

References

External links
 A T.I.M.E. web site

Obstetrics and gynaecology organizations
Haredi Judaism in New York City
Jews and Judaism in Brooklyn
Jewish organizations based in New York City
1993 establishments in New York City
Jewish organizations established in the 1990s
Jewish medical organizations